The first series of British reality television series The Apprentice (UK) was broadcast in the UK on BBC Two, from 16 February to 4 May 2005. After securing the rights to creating a British version of American original, the BBC commissioned a total of twelve episodes, a standard that would be used for consecutive series. It is the only series not to feature a boardroom scene after a candidate quit the programme following a task. Alongside the twelve episodes that were produced, two specials were also created and aired alongside this series – "The Story so Far" on 2 April, aimed at bringing viewers up to speed on the series; and "You're Hired!" on 7 May, aired after the series finale, with a format that would be later adapted for use in The Apprentice: You're Fired when it began the following year.

Fourteen candidates took part in this programme's first series, with Tim Campbell becoming the overall winner of the series. Excluding specials, the series averaged roughly around 2.5 million viewers during its broadcast.

Series overview 
Work on the series began in Autumn 2004, after the BBC successfully secured the rights to creating a British version of the American original, followed by the broadcaster receiving an agreement of acceptance from Alan Sugar to be at the head of the new programme. Involved in development of the format, Sugar worked with the production staff to determine what tasks would be faced by those participating in the series, and how he would be given feedback on these. Amongst the discussions undertaken with him, it was decided that two of Sugar's close business associates, Nick Hewer and Margaret Mountford, would star alongside him in the role of his aides, and that one of the tasks would focus on interviewing candidates who reached the penultimate stage of the process, with both Hewer and Mountford overseeing this, alongside other business associates of Sugar – Paul Kemsley, Claude Littner, and Bordan Tkachuk.

Applicants for the show were whittled down by the production staff and researchers until around fourteen candidates, consisting of a balanced mix of male and female participants, were chosen to appear in the series. As part of their first task, the candidates formed teams consisting of their respective genders – the women named their team First Forte, while the men named their team Impact. This series is unique for being the only series to date in the show's history, not to feature an extensive boardroom scene after a candidate chose to leave the programme following the fourth task, and to feature a charity-based challenge with no proper reward for the winning team. In addition, the Final of the series only allowed six "fired" candidates to return and provide assistance to the series' two finalists. The schedule for episodes was fixed towards Wednesday evenings, after the watershed period, as final edits of episodes maintained a level of content that included swearing more suitable for mature viewers than young family audiences.

Of those who took part, Tim Campbell would become the eventual winner of the series, and go on to become Project Director of Amstrad's new Health and Beauty division at the time, with his time there documented in a special episode prior to the second series, entitled "Tim in the Firing Line". In 2006, Campbell would leave the company to pursue other interests, and would go on to found the Bright Ideas Trust in 2008, offering funding and support for young people wishing to start their own business.

Candidates

Performance chart 

Key:
 The candidate won this series of The Apprentice.
 The candidate was the runner-up.
 The candidate won as project manager on his/her team, for this task.
 The candidate lost as project manager on his/her team, for this task.
 The candidate was on the winning team for this task / they passed the Interviews stage.
 The candidate was on the losing team for this task.
 The candidate was brought to the final boardroom for this task.
 The candidate was fired in this task.
 The candidate lost as project manager for this task and was fired.
 The candidate left the competition on this task.

Episodes

References

External links 

 
 Amstrad
 Saira Khan
 James Max
 Paul Torrisi
 Rachel Groves

2005 British television seasons
01